This is a list of weapons or firearms designated A1 or A-1 :

 M121/A1 155mm Cartridge, a U.S. army chemical artillery shell
 Arsenal SLR-105 A1, a semi-automatic US import version of AK-74 and its airsoft gun model, the SLR105 A1

Grenade launchers
 Heckler & Koch HK69A1, a German 40 mm grenade launcher
 L1 A1 (grenade thrower), a simply developed military weapon for firing shells

Machine guns
 HK21A1 and HK11A1, two variants of the German Heckler & Koch HK21 machine gun
 M1917A1, a variant of the American M1917 Browning machine gun

Submachine guns
 M-10A1, a variant of the 1970 United States MAC-10 submachine gun
 M1921A1, M1928A1 and M1A1, three variants of the American Thompson submachine gun
 M3A1, a variant of the American M3 submachine gun
 MP5KA1, a variant of the 1964 German Heckler & Koch MP5 submachine gun
 MP7A1, a variant of the German Heckler & Koch MP7 submachine gun

Mines
 DM-39A1 and DM-68A1, two variants of the German anti-personnel DM-39 mine
 M18A1 Claymore Antipersonnel Mine, an American directional anti-personnel mine
 MBV-78-A1 mine, a Vietnamese variant of Russian POMZ anti-personnel mine

Missiles 
 A1, a German rocket design in the Aggregate series from the 1930s
 a1 Husayn, an Iraqi indigenously produced Scud-type missile
 a1 Samoud, an Iraqi short-range ballistic missile
 Polaris A1, a 1932  German missile
 AGM-154A-1 (JSOW-A1), a variant of the American AGM-154 Joint Standoff Weapon missile
 SS.11A1 XAGM-22A, a variant of the 1953 French Nord SS.11 surface-to-surface wire-guided anti-tank missile

Pistols 
 M-A1 series, an Austrian Steyr M pistol series
 M1911A1, a version of the American M1911 pistol
 M9A1, a version of the Italian M9 pistol
 Sig Sauer P225-A1 revision of the original P225, also designated the P6, as used by German law enforcement.
 Sig Sauer M11-A1 upgraded variant of P229

Rifles 
 C8A1, a variant of the C8 Rifle
 FN A1, a variant of the Belgian FN Special Police rifle
 L1 A1, a British self load rifle 
 L96A1, a variant of the 1982 British Accuracy International Arctic Warfare sniper rifle
 M82A1, a variant of the 1989 American Barrett M82 rifle
 L85A1, L86A1 LSW, L22A1, L98A1 CGP, variants of the British SA80 rifle
 M16A1, a version of the American M16 rifle
 M1903A1, a variant of the American M1903 Springfield rifle
 M4A1, a variant of the M4 Carbine
 M82A1, M82A1A and M82A1M, three variants of the American Barrett M82 rifle
 M96-A1, a variant of the American Robinson Armaments M96 Expeditionary rifle
 PSG1A1, a variant of the German Heckler & Koch PSG1 sniper rifle
 Steyr AUG A1, a variant of the Austrian 5.56 mm assault rifle

Robots
 Samsung SGR-A1, a South Korean military robot sentry

Shotguns 
 Parker Reproduction A1 Special, a shotgun engraver by Master Engraver Geoffroy Gournet
 Mossberg 590 A1, a shot gun intended for military use

A1